Rewari Junction railway station, station code RE, is a major railway station of the Indian Railways serving the city of Rewari in the Indian state of Haryana. It is in the Jaipur Division of the North Western Railway zone and lies on the Delhi–Ajmer–Ahmedabad route. Six railway lines branch out from this railway station. The seventh railway line from Rewari will be laid as a dedicated freight railway line as a part of the Western Dedicated Freight Corridor.

Location

History

Beginning and Growth
The railway line was extended  from Rewari to Alwar and Bandikui in 1874 and then more  to Jaipur and Ajmer in 1875 by Rajputana–Malwa Railway and eventually another  to Ahmedabad in Gujarat in 1881. Eventually five metre-gauge tracks branched out from Rewari. All metre-gauge trains starting from (and terminating at) Delhi railway junction (station code DLI) to Punjab, Rajputana, Saurashtra, Kutch and north Gujarat regions passed through Rewari station. The management of Rajputana–Malwa Railways (and Rewari railway station) was transferred to Bombay, Baroda and Central India Railway (BBCI) in 1889. BBCI became Western Railway in 1951. Delhi–Rewari–Bikaner railway line was transferred to Bikaner Division of newly formed Northern Railway zone in 1952 while Rewari–Jaipur and Rewari–Ringas–Phulera sections remained in Western Railway.

Current status
Rewari–Delhi railway line was transferred from Bikaner Division of Northern Railway to Delhi Division of Northern Railway on formation of North Western Railway zone in 2002 but Rewari railway junction itself remained in North Western Railway zone. The remaining four tracks branching out from Rewari railway station belong to North Western Railway zone. Rewari station itself is in the Jaipur Division of North Western Railway zone.

Six  broad-gauge tracks branch out from Rewari towards 
Delhi  . 
Ajmer via Alwar, Bandikui and Jaipur 
Phulera via Narnaul, Neem-Ka-Thana and Ringas 
Bikaner via Loharu, Sadulpur, Churu & Ratangarh 
Bhatinda via Bhiwani and Hisar 
Rohtak via Jhajjar (constructed in 2008–2012 and commissioned in January 2013)

Gauge conversion
Conversion of  metre gauge to  broad gauge started in 1990. The Delhi–Rewari railway line had double metre-gauge tracks and one of the tracks was converted to broad gauge in December 1992 as a part of conversion of Ajmer–Delhi line. This allowed metre-gauge trains from north Rajasthan to continue up to Delhi railway junction on the remaining track while broad-gauge trains ran from Delhi railway junction to Rewari on the other track. Rewari–Bhatinda track was converted to broad gauge in December 1993 and Delhi was connected to Bhatinda (and further north) by broad gauge trains via Rewari for the first time opening an alternative route. The Rewari–Jaipur–Ajmer track was converted to broad gauge in 1994 and broad-gauge trains started running from Ajmer to Delhi via Rewari. Broad-gauge trains started running from Ahmedabad to Delhi via Rewari from May 1997.

As a result of this, all metre-gauge trains to Rewari and beyond terminated at and started from Sarai Rohilla which became a railway terminus. By September 2004, the second metre-gauge track from Sarai Rohilla to Rewari was also converted to broad gauge and all metre-gauge trains stopped operating between Rewari and Sarai Rohilla (though the converted track was "officially" dedicated to the nation by politicians only in October 2006). Rewari thus became the terminus of metre-gauge trains for the next three years. For example, the train from Bikaner to Delhi ran on metre-gauge track up to Rewari and then a connecting train ran on broad-gauge track from Rewari to Delhi Junction.

All metre-gauge railway tracks from Rewari were converted to broad gauge by the end of 2009. Therefore, metre-gauge trains stopped operating from Rewari. This obviated the need for change of trains at Rewari which no longer remained a gauge-change station. Broad-gauge trains now connected Rewari to various cities in all parts of India.

Largest metre-gauge railway junction
Rewari was the world's oldest and largest commercial metre-gauge railway junction until 2010 when this fact became a part of history. Rewari is now one of the largest railway junctions in India with six railway lines converging here. Only one railway junction in India, namely , has seven railway lines converging there. Rewari will also have seven railway lines when the railway line from Rewari to Asaoti railway station north of Palwal on the Mathura–Palwal–Tughlakabad main railway line is laid as a dedicated freight railway line as a part of the Western Dedicated Freight Corridor in a few years.

Doubling
Rewari is a major junction on the Indian Railways network. It has connections to major cities in India by direct trains and is a major freight transit station. Therefore, Ahmedabad–Rewari–Ludhiana trunk route is being doubled to cater to ever increasing containerised freight trains. The Delhi–Rewari railway line had double metre-gauge track earlier; now it has double broad-gauge track since 2008. The doubling of the track from Ajmer to Palanpur has been going on since 2010 and may complete in 2021 as most of the segments have been doubled. The track from Palanpur to Ahmedabad is also being doubled. The track to Hisar towards Ludhiana is being doubled and a segment has been doubled up to Kosli.

Future plans

Electrification
Rewari railway station has electrified tracks as the Alwar-Rewari–Hisar and Rewari–Narnaul–Ringas–Phulera railway tracks have been electrified in 2017. Electrification of Rewari–Ajmer railway track is completed in 2020. Electric trains (EMU) may run between Delhi and Rewari when the track is electrified.

The electrical locomotives on these tracks will have a special pantograph for the high catenary. (OHE height is 5.5 metre for normal electrical locomotives.)

A Regional Mass Rapid Transport Service (RRTS) is planned to come up on Delhi Nizamuddin station-Gurgaon–Rewari–Alwar route to enhance connectivity between Delhi and the developing manufacturing hubs in Rewari district and Bhiwadi.
The alignment of a new railway line of Rapid Regional Transit System (RRTS) from existing Nizamuddin station in New Delhi to Gurgaon–Manesar–Dharuhera–Rewari–Bawal–Shahjanpur–Alwar has been finalised. It will have a railway station east of Rewari at village Majra Gurdas.

Seventh railway line
This railway line will now be built from Rewari to Pirthal and Asaoti railway station north of Palwal on the Mathura–Palwal–Tughlakabad main railway line  as a dedicated freight railway line as a part of the Western Dedicated Freight Corridor being constructed by Dedicated Freight Corridor Corporation of India (DFCCI).

Western Dedicated Freight Corridor
As there is not much space available at Rewari railway yard, a container stabling yard is being built west of Rewari station at Khori. On the eastern end of the railway line from Rewari towards Dadri, a container yard and industrial estate is being built at Pirthal near Asaoti railway station north of Palwal. The project is being funded by Japan.

Double-stacked container freight trains
Rewari is a major transit station for freight traffic from Bombay, Kandla and other ports in western India towards Delhi and northern states/union territories of Haryana, Punjab, Himachal Pradesh and Jammu and Kashmir. As the railway tracks from Kandla, Pipavav, Mundra and other ports in Saurashtra to Ahmedabad and Palanpur and then to Rewari via Ringas were not electrified, freight trains (goods trains) with containers double-stacked ply on this route to Rewari junction and then take the containers further north from Rewari. Infringements like low road overbridges and foot overbridges that fouled with double-stacked containers were either dismantled or raised in years 2004–06 for running these freight trains.

In India freight (goods) trains can carry standard containers double-stacked on flat-bed wagons with normal axle load of about 22 tonnes and do not require special low-bed wagons unlike in other countries that have (relatively narrow)  standard gauge. They carry almost 4000 tonnes per rake which is almost twice the load a normal goods train can haul. Some double-stacked container freight trains on this route through Rewari station also carry "high cube" containers that are 2896 mm (9 ft 6 inch) high (higher than standard containers that are generally 8 ft or 2.438 mm high) on special low-well wagons owned by private clients. Some private logistics operators have built container storage yards north of Rewari near Garhi Harsaru (south of Gurgaon) for this purpose.

Rewari–Ringas–Ajmer–Palanpur–Mehsana railway track is now electrified. This track has a high catenary with 7.45 m high OHE for double-stack containers from Kandla port on the Western Dedicated Freight Corridor. The electrical locomotives on these tracks have a special pantograph for the high catenary. (OHE height is 5.5 metre for normal electrical locomotives.)

Facilities
Rewari railway station has all major facilities like high-level platforms, waiting rooms, restaurants, computerised ticket reservation, bookshop and retiring rooms for sleeping. On conversion of metre-gauge tracks to broad gauge, the station yard was remodelled and the tracks and platforms were rearranged to provide 8 platforms in 2009–10; low-level metre-gauge platforms were raised higher. Some heritage buildings that were more than 100 years old were demolished to lay new railway lines and build high-level platforms. New buildings have been constructed.

Trains
Before 2006, metre-gauge trains from Rewari terminated at Delhi and there was no direct train from Rewari to east or south of Delhi or beyond Ahmedabad in the west. Rewari was also not connected by metre-gauge trains with metre-gauge railway networks of Uttar Pradesh, Bihar, Madhya Pradesh and South India. Now Rewari railway station is connected by trains with many major cities of India. Rewari railway station's location on the Delhi-Ajmer-Ahmedabad trunk route and on the route to Punjab makes it an important railway junction. Numerous express and superfast trains from all over the country pass through it. About 90 trains (45 pairs of trains) originate or stop at Rewari railway station as in November 2012.

The following is a list of a few trains stopping at Rewari railway station.

Rewari Heritage Steam Locomotive Museum

Rewari Railway Heritage Museum is the only surviving steam loco shed in India and houses some of India's last surviving steam locomotives. Built in 1893, it was the only loco shed in North India for a long time and a part of the track connecting Delhi with Peshawar. After steam engines were phased out by the 1990s and steam traction on metre-gauge tracks was discontinued in January 1994, the loco shed remained in neglect for many years before it was decided to rehabilitate it. The steam shed reopened in May 2002. In December 2002 Indian Railways declared it a heritage museum. The shed was refurbished as a heritage tourism destination, its heritage edifice was restored and a museum was added by the Indian Railways exhibiting Victorian-era artefacts used on the Indian rail network, along with the old signalling system, gramophones and seats. The refurbished heritage museum was opened in October 2010. The engines will also be available for live demonstrations.

Rewari steam loco shed, being the only surviving repository of steam locos in India housing some of India's last surviving steam locomotives, has become an ideal choice for filmmakers. The Rewari steam locos have been rented out for various film shoots and a part of the film Gandhi, My Father was shot here. The locos at the shed have appeared in films such as Gadar: Ek Prem Katha, Love Aaj Kal, Gandhi and Bhaag Milkha Bhaag among others.

Fairy Queen steam engine
Fairy Queen is the oldest working engine in the world and one of national treasure (cultural artifacts) of India. The engine was built in 1855 and acquired by the Eastern Indian Railways from a British firm. Now it is used to haul a train used for tourism purposes that departs from the Delhi Cantonment railway station and reaches its destination at Alwar in Rajasthan via Rewari.

See also 
 Indian Railways 
 Rewari
 Rewari district

References

External links 

  Rewari Junction to Delhi Train Timings
  Train Arrivals at Rewari Junction
  Train Departures from Rewari Junction
  Rewari railway station satellite map
 Official website of the Rewari district

Railway stations in Rewari district
Jaipur railway division
Railway junction stations in Haryana
Railway stations opened in 1873